John Leypold Griffith Lee (1869 – May 29, 1952) was an American politician and lawyer. He served in the Maryland House of Delegates, representing Harford County, and served as the Speaker of the Maryland House of Delegates in 1922.

Early life
John Leypold Griffith Lee was born in 1869, in Bel Air, Maryland to Sallie (née Griffith) and Colonel Otho Scott Lee. He attended Bel Air Academy. Lee graduated from the Johns Hopkins University in 1893. He then graduated from the University of Maryland School of Law. He was admitted to the bar on December 13, 1883.

Career
Lee worked as a lawyer and farmer. He worked as an assistant district attorney under William L. Marbury. He served on the staff of Governor Edwin Warfield.

Lee was a Democrat. Lee served in the Maryland House of Delegates, representing Harford County, in 1896, 1918 and 1922. He served as Speaker of the Maryland House of Delegates in 1922. Lee ran against Millard Tydings for the Democratic nomination for U.S. Senator.

Personal life

Lee married Caroline Webster Hunter, of Bel Air, on January 10, 1914. After their marriage, they lived at 829 North Charles Street in Baltimore.

Lee died on May 29, 1952, at his home in Bel Air. He was buried at Rock Spring Cemetery in Forest Hill, Maryland.

References

External links

1869 births
1952 deaths
People from Bel Air, Maryland
Johns Hopkins University alumni
University of Maryland Francis King Carey School of Law alumni
Speakers of the Maryland House of Delegates
Democratic Party members of the Maryland House of Delegates
Maryland lawyers
Farmers from Maryland